Sergeant Major Johnson Gideon Beharry,  (born 26 July 1979) is a British Army soldier who, on 18 March 2005, was awarded the Victoria Cross, the highest military decoration for valour in the British and Commonwealth armed forces, for saving members of his unit, the 1st Battalion Princess of Wales's Royal Regiment, from ambushes on 1 May and again on 11 June 2004 at Al-Amarah, Iraq. He sustained serious head injuries in the latter engagement. Beharry was formally invested with the Victoria Cross by Queen Elizabeth II on 27 April 2005.

Personal life
Beharry was born in Grenada, and has four brothers and three sisters. Beharry is of Dougla (African and Indian) descent. His surname is the anglicised depiction of Bihari, originating from a region of India indentured labourers were brought from to the Caribbean. He moved to the United Kingdom in 1999. He is divorced from his first wife Lynthia Beharry, who is also from Grenada. Beharry said, in an official statement released through the Ministry of Defence, that the trauma of his war experiences had caused difficulties in his marriage.

He subsequently remarried in London on 18 March 2013 to Mallissa Venice Noel and they now have two children, a boy and a girl. Beharry is a Freemason.

Army career
Beharry joined the Princess of Wales's Royal Regiment in August 2001. After training at Catterick, he became a driver of Warrior armoured vehicles in C Company, 1st Battalion. Prior to Iraq, he served for six months in Kosovo and three months in Northern Ireland.

Awards and campaign medals

Although Beharry served three months in Northern Ireland, Beharry's service was during the firefighters' strike, when he manned a fire tender. As such he was not engaged in the operational nature of service in Northern Ireland and did not qualify for the General Service Medal (GSM) with Northern Ireland clasp.

Actions in Iraq

On 1 May 2004, Beharry was driving a Warrior Tracked Armoured Vehicle that had been called to the assistance of a foot patrol caught in a series of ambushes. The Warrior was hit by multiple rocket propelled grenades, causing damage and resulting in the loss of radio communications. The platoon commander, the vehicle's gunner and a number of other soldiers in the vehicle were injured. Due to damage to his periscope optics, Beharry was forced to open his hatch to steer his vehicle, exposing his face and head to withering small arms fire. Beharry drove the disabled Warrior through the ambush, taking his own crew and leading five other Warriors to safety. He then extracted his wounded comrades from the vehicle, all the time exposed to further enemy fire. He was cited on this occasion for "valour of the highest order".

While back on duty on 11 June 2004, Beharry was again driving the lead Warrior of his platoon through Al Amarah when his vehicle was ambushed. A rocket propelled grenade hit the vehicle six inches from Beharry's head, and he received serious shrapnel injuries to his face and brain. Other rockets then hit the vehicle, incapacitating his commander and injuring several of the crew. Despite his life-threatening injuries, Beharry retained control of his vehicle and drove it out of the ambush area before losing consciousness. He required brain surgery for his head injuries, and he was still recovering in March 2005 when he was awarded the Victoria Cross.

Citation and first living recipient in over 30 years
The full citation was published in a supplement to the London Gazette of 18 March 2005 and commented, "Private Beharry carried out two individual acts of great heroism by which he saved the lives of his comrades. Both were in direct face of the enemy, under intense fire, at great personal risk to himself (one leading to him sustaining very serious injuries)... Beharry displayed repeated extreme gallantry and unquestioned valour, despite intense direct attacks, personal injury and damage to his vehicle in the face of relentless enemy action."

Beharry was the first recipient of the Victoria Cross since the posthumous awards to Lieutenant Colonel H. Jones and Sergeant Ian John McKay for service in the Falklands War in 1982. He was the first living recipient of the VC since Keith Payne and Rayene Stewart Simpson, both Australian, for actions in Vietnam in 1969, and the first living recipient of the VC in the British Army since Rambahadur Limbu, a Gurkha, in the Indonesia-Malaysia confrontation in 1965. At the time of his award, he was one of only ten living recipients of the VC.

Afterwards
As of 23 September 2006, as a result of his injuries, he still had severe pain in his back and head. He continued to be financially supported by the army but was unfit for duty due to the serious nature of his injuries in combat.

On 26 September 2006 it was reported that he had been promoted to the rank of lance corporal.

In February 2007 his portrait was presented to the National Portrait Gallery in London by the artist Emma Wesley and has since become part of the gallery's collection.

On 3 September 2007 Beharry visited the veterans mental health charity Gardening Leave to open the Poppy Collection.

On 19 May 2007 Beharry brought the FA Cup onto the field at the new Wembley Stadium before the final between Chelsea and Manchester United.

On 11 November 2008 Beharry acted as an escort to 110-year-old Harry Patch, then one of only three remaining British survivors of the First World War, at the Cenotaph in London's Whitehall to commemorate the 90th anniversary of the signing of the armistice which ended that conflict. On 11 November 2009, Beharry, and Mark Donaldson—the first recipient of the Victoria Cross for Australia (though not the first Australian recipient of the Victoria Cross)—handed a wreath to the Queen during a service in Westminster Abbey which marked the deaths in 2009 of the last three veterans of the First World War resident in the United Kingdom, Bill Stone, Henry Allingham and Harry Patch. The wreath was then laid on the Tomb of the Unknown Warrior.

In December 2008 he drove his car into a lamppost at 100 mph in a suicide attempt, depressed and haunted by nightmares of his time in Iraq. He escaped unharmed and sought help from the organization Combat Stress. He later spoke out urging similarly affected veterans to do the same.

On 30 April 2010 Beharry visited Duke of York's Royal Military School to take the salute at Parade and to present the Baroness Thatcher Sword of Honour to the JUO of the winning Guard at Drill Competition. The Sword of Honour was first presented by Baroness Thatcher the previous year. He took time to talk to pupils on Parade and visited the boys of Roberts House.

On 1 June 2012 Beharry was promoted to corporal and moved to a public relations role with the Household Division. He therefore held the appointment of lance sergeant, as do all corporals serving in the Household Division.
His current rank in 2021 is Colour Sergeant.

On 30 June 2012 Beharry carried the torch for the 2012 Summer Olympics through the National Memorial Arboretum in Alrewas.

At the 2022 State funeral of Elizabeth II Beharry pushed the wheelchair of Keith Payne, VC.

In addition to still serving in the army within the London District, he is now very active with his charitable foundation set up on 5 September 2014. The JBVC Foundation supports youths in getting away from gang culture and helps rehabilitate former offenders, helping with training and getting them into sustainable employment in the future.

Publishing deal
On 18 September 2005 it was reported in the press that Beharry had obtained a publishing deal worth £1.5 million to write an autobiography of his experiences. His book, entitled Barefoot Soldier, was ghostwritten in collaboration with Nick Cook and was published in October 2006.

In the media
Beharry was interviewed for the 2006 television docudrama Victoria Cross Heroes which also included archive footage and dramatisations of his actions.

According to The Daily Telegraph, a planned 90-minute drama about Beharry was cancelled by the BBC allegedly because it was too positive and would alienate members of the audience opposed to the war in Iraq.

He spoke out on BBC News on 28 February 2009 criticising the lack of support for ex-servicemen and women suffering from mental health problems, and revealing his own ongoing flashbacks and other symptoms.

From 9 January to 20 March 2011, Beharry competed in the 2011 season of Dancing on Ice. He was partnered with Canadian ice skater, Jodeyne Higgins. He reached the semi-finals, broadcast on 20 March 2011.

In 2013 a portrait was painted of Beharry in the first series of Artist of the Year by Nick Lord.

On 11 November 2012 Beharry appeared on the Aled Jones Radio 2 show.

On 28 October 2016 Beharry appeared on the BBC Cookery show Great British Menu where he, along with other recipients of honours from Elizabeth II, was guest at a banquet honouring Great Britons who had been awarded honours such as OBEs and CBEs during Queen Elizabeth II's reign.

Honours
 On 22 July 2011 Johnson Beharry was awarded the Honorary degree of Doctor of Engineering (D.Eng) from the University of Sussex.
 He was given the Freedom of the Borough of Southwark on 12 May 2012.
 He was given the Freedom of the Borough of Hounslow on 17 September 2014.

Notes

References

External links

 A 'great hero' who saved comrades – full citation (BBC News, 18 March 2005)
 Private twice rescued colleagues while under heavy fire in Iraq (The Guardian, 18 March 2005)
 MOD press release (18 March 2005)
 Video Interview

1979 births
Living people
Black British soldiers
Princess of Wales's Royal Regiment soldiers
British Army personnel of the Iraq War
Grenadian people of Indian descent
Grenadian emigrants to England
Grenadian recipients of the Victoria Cross
Grenadian people with disabilities
British Army recipients of the Victoria Cross